Thomas Spelling (born 9 February 1993) is a Danish ice hockey player. He is currently playing with Aalborg Pirates of the Metal Ligaen. Spelling was selected by the New York Rangers in the 5th round (142nd overall) of the 2012 NHL Entry Draft.

Spelling made his Elitserien (now the SHL) debut playing with Rögle BK during the 2012–13 Elitserien season.

Career statistics

Regular season and playoffs

Awards and honors
 Danish Champion: 2014-15, 2013–14, 2011–12, 2010-11
 Danish Cup winner: 2011-12

References

External links

1993 births
Living people
Danish ice hockey forwards
Rögle BK players
New York Rangers draft picks
People from Herning Municipality
Sportspeople from the Central Denmark Region